Care and Relief Foundation or CRF, is an independent, non-profit organisation, founded in 2012 by Allama Syed Zafar Ullah Shah and is based in the United Kingdom.
Primary aim of the Care and Relief Foundation is to enable those deprived of their basic rights of life. The Care and Relief Foundation believes firmly in helping those who cannot help themselves to be self-sufficient to meet their basic needs. This non-profit organization works in Pakistan and abroad to provide food, clean water, medical facilities, solar power and equipment for people with disabilities for rehabilitation and social inclusion.

Introduction
Care and Relief Foundation's humanitarian activities started when Syed Zafar Ullah Shah permanently moved to Britain from Pakistan. He has been working with UK Based charity  Islamic Help for long time. In 2012, he formally established the non profit organization with the name of Care and Relief Foundation.

Mission
Care and Relief Foundation is a nonprofit organization, whose main objectives are as follows:

Water Project (Water for All)
Food Project (Food for All)
Light for All
Mosque Construction
Emergency Services
orphanage
Shadi Project

Water Project
The major, conspicuous project of Care & Relief Foundation, that's designated with the name of Water Project, is including such sorts of welfare, and benefiting activities which can be recognized as the acts, that should be developing the people forward to social advancement, and civilizing their life style, and flourishing their environment with the fundamental facilitation, so as, the habitats of these desolated and deprived rural localities be thankful of their lives.

Dug well
Care & Relief Foundation has been working in Tharparkar under the attribution of project of Sabeel-e-Hussaini. Care & Relief Foundation has achieved the completion of first initial stages of project, in selected several village regions with the constructions of dug wells.

Hand pump
Hand pumps are one of convenient ways for being supplied instantaneously with water. People of district Tharparkar are used to hand pumps for their short chores of daily life. Care and Relief Foundation, has been concerned with this, as next to priority after wells. Care and Relief Foundation has located many regions, where it is better to have there a hand pump, then a well, for their usage are at maximum indices.

RO Plant
Care and Relief Foundation, took initiative and planted RO Plants in Tharparkar, Umerkot and Pind Dadan Khan so that people in these areas can gain access to clean drinking water.

Food Project
Food Project, has been projected as an activity, with intentions of providing the poverty-stricken inhabitants of less developed areas and countryside regions, with necessary means, so as that, regional poverty can be revoked by strengthened individual economy, and by stabilizing the income generating abilities of individuals, families & communities.

Light for All
Tharparkar, has another thing added for its misfortune, and that is the facility of electricity, which is now the days, is regarded the most of all, influential and effective factor of the development of civilizational state of people, and their economical as well as financial phase. Care & Relief Foundation has started a project with the name "Enlightenment Initiative". Here the former part of name means, brightening the darkness of their lives, rendered by harsh conditions, and the later portion just signifies the first place and emphasizes the furtherance in its scope.

Enlightenment Initiative has been carried out to be in act, initially by the installations of home small electrical setups powered by the solar cells. Recently a few of houses & families has been benefited with, and in upcoming days, few of villages be benefited with these solar panels. Project materials are included of simple, but essential appliances, such as single fan, pair of fluorescence light savers.

Mosque construction
Care and Relief foundation has taken initiative to construct Masjids in the area of Tharparkar. The Mosques are mainly built on the land where the previous one stood and will continue to be looked after by the communities they serve with the support of Care and Relief Foundation. Care and Relief Foundation build Masajid to educate the Muslim children, to aware the Muslims about religion and Islamic practices, to socialize the village, for the religious celebrations in village.

Emergency services
Care and Relief foundation provides emergency relief in natural disasters by supplying food, water, camps and free medical camps.

Orphanage
Care and Relief Foundation sponsor hundreds of orphans in Tharparkar, Pakistan. Care and Relief Foundation provides them shelter, food, education (both Islamic and Scientific) clothing and medical care.

See also
Volunteerism

References

External links
Care and Relief Foundation, Pakistan
Syed Zafar Ullah Shah
CRF's Official Facebook Page

Non-profit organisations based in the United Kingdom
Charities based in the United Kingdom
Organizations established in 2012
2012 establishments in the United Kingdom